Kashif Ali (born November 4, 1992, né: Babar) is a Pakistani singer-songwriter and musician. He rose to fame in 2013 as a finalist on the first season of  Pakistan Idol, coming in fourth place.

In 2016, he recorded a song "Mera Mann" for his Bollywood debut film Laal Rang, that earned him critical acclaim and later that year he marked his Coke Studio debut as a featured artist in season 9, as a part of team Sheraz Uppal.

Career

2013–2014:Pakistan Idol
Ali auditioned for first season of Pakistan Idol in Karachi. Ali passed, theater rounds and made it to Top 24 finalist. In semifinals Group 2, he performed Javed Ali's "Mere Maula" and eliminated on January 19, 2014 but was brought back for Wild Card where he performed Kailash Kher's,"Sayyan" and was saved by public. Ali he was eliminated during the "Top 4" show after performing Nusrat Fateh Ali Khan's "Ajaa Teno Akhiyaan" on April 13, 2014.

 Performance

Coke Studio
After collaborating with Sheraz Uppal in film Laal Rang, he debut as a featured artist in ninth season of Coke Studio, as part of Uppal team.

Film
 Laal Rang – "Mera Mann" (2016)
Shyraa Roy Duet – "Duniya" (2021)

Television
 2013–2014: Pakistan Idol – (Season 1) 
 2016: Coke Studio – (Season 9)

References

External links
  
 Kashif Ali at Coke Studio

Pakistani pop singers
1992 births
Living people
Singers from Lahore